Pleurotomella hayesiana is a species of sea snail, a marine gastropod mollusk in the family Raphitomidae.

Description
The length of the shell attains 18 mm.

(Original description) The rather solid shell has an ovately fusiform shape. It is of a dull chalky-grey colour. The shell contains 7 whorls,  angulated at the upper part, closely longitudinally ribbed and transversely ridged, forming flattened nodules at the points of intersection. The spire is sharp. The apex is purple. The aperture is elongately ovate, deep purple within. The outer lip is finely denticulated at the edge, contracted below. The posterior sinus is narrow and rather deep.

Distribution
This marine species is endemic to Australia and occurs off New South Wales at depths between 4 m and 27 m.

References

 Beu, A.G. 2011 Marine Molluscs of oxygen isotope stages of the last 2 million years in New Zealand. Part 4. Gastropoda (Ptenoglossa, Neogastropoda, Heterobranchia). Journal of the Royal Society of New Zealand 41, 1–153
 Laseron, C. 1954. Revision of the New South Wales Turridae (Mollusca). Australian Zoological Handbook. Sydney : Royal Zoological Society of New South Wales pp. 56, pls 1–12.

External links
 Seashells of New South Wales: Asperdaphne hayesiana
 
 Gastropods.com: Asperdaphne (Asperdaphne) hayesiana

hayesiana
Gastropods described in 1871
Gastropods of Australia